The Practice of Beauty is a 2011 Russian comedy film directed by Viktor Shamirov.

Plot 
The film tells about the difficulties of theatrical life, star fever, a showdown with the producer, flirting in the living room...

Cast 
 Yuriy Kutsenko
 Kseniya Radchenko
 Pavel Savinkov
 Viktor Shamirov
 Konstantin Yushkevich

References

External links 
 

2011 films
2010s Russian-language films
Russian comedy films
2011 comedy films